In the decade following its founding, the Green Party of Ontario did not have a formal leadership structure, and was run in a very decentralized manner (nominal leaders were sometimes chosen for elections, but they had no personal authority over party decisions).  Frank De Jong and others opposed this approach, and successfully campaigned for a formal leadership contest in 1993.

Green Party of Ontario leadership election, 1993
Frank De Jong  entered this contest, and defeated Jim Harris, who later became leader of the Green Party of Canada.

Green Party of Ontario leadership election, 2001

De Jong was challenged for the leadership of the Ontario Green Party by Judy Greenwood-Speers in 2001 and was re-elected.

Green Party of Ontario leadership election, 2009

In 2009, de Jong announced that he will be stepping down as party leader. His successor will be chosen at the November 13–15, 2009 Ontario Green Party leadership election. Mike Schreiner was the only candidate to enter the race and his election was affirmed on November 14, 2009.

 
Ontario